“Anxiety Is the Dizziness of Freedom” is a science fiction novella by American writer Ted Chiang, initially published in 2019 collection Exhalation: Stories. The novella's name quotes a proverb by Danish philosopher Søren Kierkegaard in his work The Concept of Anxiety. An abridged version of the novella was also published under the title "Better Versions of You" in the literary supplement to The New York Times.

Plot summary
In the near future, quantum mechanics and computer technology have discovered parallel realities, and a device has been invented which will create parallel realities according to the Many-worlds interpretation of quantum mechanics. These devices make a single quantum measurement, which can be one of either of two quantum states, and then displays either a red or a blue light based on that measurement result. This creates two different timelines, initially identical (except for the color of the lights), but which diverge as time progresses. The device also allows communication between those two parallel timelines (but only those two timelines, not others), allowing the user to see what would have been different (for example, if they had decided to choose a particular choice depending on whether a red or blue light was shown). The ability to learn about alternate timelines causes existential crises for many people: “Many worried that their choices were rendered meaningless because every action they took was counterbalanced by a branch in which they had made the opposite choice.” 

The story is narrated from the view of two women: Nat, who works in a shop selling "parallel reality" access devices, and Dana, a psychologist who treats people struggling with this new technology. Nat is engaged in a confidence game: she is attending group therapy sessions given by psychologist Dana, with a hidden motive of trying to convince another participant in the sessions to sell his device, which she and her collaborator believe could be valuable.

Awards

See also
Alternate history
Coherence, a 2013 film about people who must deal with reality-bending events following a comet sighting.
"The Garden of Forking Paths", a 1941 short story by Argentine writer and poet Jorge Luis Borges.
 Many-worlds interpretation
 Everett phone

References

External links 
 
"Anxiety Is the Dizziness of Freedom". Online copy at OneZero
Discussion at Tor.com

Science fiction short stories
2019 short stories
Short stories by Ted Chiang